Eugene Wesley (Jud) Larson (January 21, 1923 Grand Prairie, Texas – June 11, 1966 Reading, Pennsylvania) was an American racecar driver.

Larson drove in the USAC Championship Car series, racing in the 1956-1959 and 1964-1965 seasons with 53 starts, including the 1958 and 1959 Indianapolis 500 races.  He finished in the top ten 38 times, with 7 victories.

Larson died as a result of injuries sustained in a sprint car crash that also claimed the life of Red Riegel. Larson is buried at 	
Cook-Walden Capital Parks Cemetery and Mausoleum in Pflugerville, Texas.

Complete AAA/USAC Championship Car results

Indianapolis 500 results

World Championship career summary
The Indianapolis 500 was part of the FIA World Championship from 1950 through 1960. Drivers competing at Indy during those years were credited with World Championship points and participation. Jud Larson participated in 2 World Championship races but scored no World Championship points.

Awards
He was inducted in the National Sprint Car Hall of Fame in 1992.

References

External links

 

1923 births
1966 deaths
Indianapolis 500 drivers
Racing drivers who died while racing
National Sprint Car Hall of Fame inductees
Sports deaths in Pennsylvania
People from Grand Prairie, Texas
Racing drivers from Dallas
Racing drivers from Texas